Phycitodes lacteella is a species of snout moth first described by Walter Rothschild in 1915. It is found in most of Europe (except Ireland, Great Britain, Norway, the Benelux, Switzerland, the Baltic region, Poland, the Czech Republic, Slovakia, Slovenia, Croatia and Ukraine), Algeria, Morocco and Turkey.

Adults are on wing in September.

References

Moths described in 1915
Phycitini
Moths of Europe
Moths of Asia